The {{nihongo|Ibuki-class|伊吹型|Ibuki-gata}} cruisers were the last class of heavy cruisers built for the Imperial Japanese Navy (IJN). In order to save design time, the ships were essentially repeats of the earlier . Begun during World War II, only the lead ship, was launched, but she was in the process of being converted into a light aircraft carrier when construction was suspended in 1945. She was scrapped the following year. The unnamed second ship was scrapped less than a month after being laid down in order to clear her slipway for an aircraft carrier.

Design and description
The design of the Ibuki class was a minor improvement over the last pair of the Mogami class after those ships had been upgraded during the late 1930s. The main improvement was the replacement of the triple torpedo tube mounts in the older ships with quadruple mounts. They cost 60,000,000 yen each and had a crew of 54 officers and 822 enlisted men.

The ships had a length of  overall.

Electrical power was supplied by three  turbo generators and two  diesel generators.

Armament
The main armament of the Ibuki class was intended to be ten 50-caliber 20 cm 3rd Year Type No. 2 guns mounted in twin turrets, three forward and two aft of the superstructure, numbered one through five from the bow to the stern. The first two forward turrets were on the same level, but the third turret could superfire over the first two. The guns could depress to −5° and had a maximum elevation of 55°. The secondary armament was to consist of eight 40-caliber 12.7 cm Type 89 anti-aircraft (AA) guns in twin mounts. The ships were also intended to be equipped with four twin 25 mm Type 96 light AA guns abreast the funnel. The maximum effective rate of fire was only between 110 and 120 rounds per minute due to the frequent need to change the fifteen-round magazines. Two twin 13.2 mm Type 93 machine gun mounts were supposed to be mounted on the bridge with 2,000 rounds per gun.

The Ibuki-class ships were intended to be armed with four rotating quadruple  Type 92 torpedo tubes, two on each broadside. The ship carried 24 Type 93 torpedoes, 16 in the tubes and 8 in reserve. Quick-reloading gear was installed for every mount that allowed the reserve torpedoes to be loaded in three to five minutes in ideal conditions. The Type 93 torpedo, fueled by compressed oxygen and widely referred to in post-war literature as the "Long Lance", had three range/speed settings. Before Ibuki was launched, one proposal was made to replace the aircraft and their equipment with five quintuple Type 0 torpedo tube mounts. Two of these would be mounted on each side and the last on the centerline, but nothing was done.

Fire control, sensors and aircraft
Two Type 94 fire-control directors, one atop the bridge and the other abaft the funnel, were going to be fitted to control the main guns. They used range data received from three  coincidence rangefinders. Two of these were to be installed in turrets Nos. 3 and 4 while the primary rangefinder was mounted above the bridge. A pair of Type 94 high-angle directors, one on each side of the bridge, were intended to control the Type 89 guns. Each director was fitted with a  rangefinder. The 25 mm guns would have been controlled by two Type 95 directors mounted on the bridge.

Early warning would have been provided by a Type 2, Mark 2, Model 1 air search radar mounted at the top of the foremast. A Type 93 passive hydrophone system would have been fitted in the bow. The ships were designed to carry three aircraft on a platform between the funnel and the mainmast. These would have consisted of one three-seat Aichi E13A and two two-seat Yokosuka E14Y floatplanes. They would have been launched by a pair of Kure Type 2 aircraft catapults, one on each side of the aircraft platform. The ships would have carried a total of 122 powder charges for the catapults as well as four  bombs for the aircraft.

Armor
The ships' armor scheme was only slightly modified from the Mogami-class cruisers. Their waterline armoured belt extended all the way down to the double bottom. It extended from the forward to the rear magazines below the fore and aft turrets and was angled inwards at the top 20° from the vertical to improve its resistance to horizontal shellfire. The outer ends of the fore and aft machinery compartments was protected by a  transverse bulkhead.

The main gun turrets had  of armor on all sides and on the roof. There was no separate anti-torpedo bulkhead as that function was performed by the lower extension of the belt armor.

Ships
The two Ibuki-class cruisers were ordered in November 1941 as part of the IJN's Rapid Naval Armaments Supplement Programme. Both ships were laid down without names, just as Warships No. 300 and No. 301, but the former was named Ibuki on 5 April 1943.
 

 
No. 301 was ordered scrapped less than a month after she was laid down in order to clear her slipway for the carrier  which was laid down on 1 October 1942. After her launch, the construction of Ibuki was suspended in July 1943 while her fate was discussed. A possible conversion to a fast oiler was considered until the Navy decided on 25 August to convert her to a light aircraft carrier at Sasebo Naval Arsenal. Work on the conversion did not begin until the incomplete hull was towed to Sasebo on 21 December. It was originally intended to complete her in March 1945, but this was extended until August. Construction was suspended on 16 March, when the ship was about 80% complete, to allow for the construction of small submarines. Ibuki was scrapped at Sasebo from 22 November 1946 to 1 August 1947.

Notes

References

 

 
Cruiser classes
World War II cruisers of Japan
Proposed ships
Aircraft carriers of the Imperial Japanese Navy
Postwar Japan